Nijmegen Heyendaal is a railway station located near Radboud University in the southeast of Nijmegen, the Netherlands. The station was opened on 28 May 1972 and is located on the Maaslijn (Nijmegen–Venlo). The train services are operated by Arriva.

Until 1991, a branch line ran from Heyendaal station to Kleve, Germany. During that time the station had three tracks: 1 and 2 for Nijmegen–Venlo services and 3 for the Nijmegen–Kleve service, although the latter never stopped there. In 2006, a busway was opened over the site of the third track all the way from the Nijmegen's main station to Heyendaal station.

Train services
The following local train services call at this station:
Stoptrein: Nijmegen–Venlo–Roermond
Stoptrein: Nijmegen–Venray

Bus services
A bus stop near the station, called Station Heyendaal, is used by both urban and regional bus services operated by Breng.

 9: Nijmegen (Centraal Station)–Station Heyendaal–Hatert–Overasselt–Nederasselt–Grave
 10: Nijmegen (Centraal Station)–Station Heyendaal–University–University Medical Center–Station Heyendaal–Nijmegen (Centraal Station) (Shuttle Bus)
 11: Beuningen–Brabantse Poort–Station Nijmegen Goffert–University–Station Heyendaal –Nijmegen (Centraal Station)
 12: Druten–Station Nijmegen Goffert–University–Station Heyendaal –Nijmegen (Centraal Station)
 14: Brakkenstein–University–Station Heyendaal–Nijmegen (Centraal Station)–Plein 1944–Lent–Oosterhout–Elst–Arnhem CS
 15: Lent–Plein 1944–Nijmegen (Centraal Station)–Station Heyendaal–University–CWZ Hospital–Station Dukenburg–Wijchen South–Wijchen
 300: Arnhem CS–Huissen–Bemmel–Lent–Plein 1944–Nijmegen CS–Station Heyendaal–University–Radboud UMC–HAN Hogeschool

External links
NS website 
Dutch public transport travel planner 

Heyendaal
Railway stations opened in 1972
Railway stations on the Maaslijn
1972 establishments in the Netherlands
Railway stations in the Netherlands opened in the 20th century